Miguel Robles (born December 7, 1987) is a national-record holding backstroke swimmer from Mexico. He has swum for Mexico at the:
World Championships: 2007 and 2009
Pan American Games: 2011
Central American & Caribbean Games: 2006, 2010

As of the end of 2011, he holds the Mexican Records in the 100 and 200 backstroke for both long course and short course.

References

1987 births
Mexican male swimmers
Sportspeople from Monterrey
Swimmers at the 2011 Pan American Games
Living people
Central American and Caribbean Games silver medalists for Mexico
Central American and Caribbean Games bronze medalists for Mexico
Competitors at the 2010 Central American and Caribbean Games
Central American and Caribbean Games medalists in swimming
Pan American Games competitors for Mexico
21st-century Mexican people
20th-century Mexican people